Szentgál is a village in Veszprém county, Hungary. It is best known for the series of caves in the surrounding area.

Notable residents 

 József Bánóczi (1849-1926), Hungarian Jewish scholar

References

External links 
 Street map (in Hungarian)
  (in Hungarian)

Populated places in Veszprém County